Blade & Soulis a game developed by NCSoft (Team Bloodlust) of Wuxia theme massively multiplayer online role-playing game. Blade & Soul was released in Western territories on January 19, 2016. A Japanese animated television adaptation aired on April 3, 2014, on TBS and other stations then finished on June 26.

The mobile game adaptation Blade & Soul Revolution was released on December 6, 2018.

Gameplay
Blade & Soul features a combination of martial arts- which is based on style of Wuxia and qinggong in an open-world environment. Players create playable characters that explore around the world by completing quests assigned by various NPCs. The game uses a real-time battle system in the third-person camera view and requires players to "combo" a series of attacks, much like that of fighting games. The game also features an innovative "Downed" mechanic, allowing players to recover from the brink of death. Players begin with "player-versus environment" combat (PvE) but may participate in "player-versus-player" (PvP) combat later in the game.

Character customization
Blade & Soul provides a highly customizable system and NPCs in the game are made with the character customization system. Customizations a player has access to include hairstyles, facial structures, facial markings and makeup, eye color, height, and body sliders.

Races
Characters may be one of four playable races based on the Four Chinese Symbols: The Gon (based on the Azure Dragon), the Jin (based on the Black Tortoise), the Yun (based on the Vermillion Bird, also known as the Fenghuang), or the Lyn (based on the White Tiger).

Development
Weeks before NCmedia day, NCSoft announced a new Unreal Engine 3-based MMORPG only known by its codename Project [M]. For the next two weeks, a teaser website was updated revealing more information about the project.

During E3 2007, Sony entered into an exclusive deal with NCSoft to produce new titles exclusively for the PlayStation 3. This contract included titles from both existing intellectual properties owned by NCSoft.
Blade & Soul, alongside Guild Wars 2, was being developed for release on the PlayStation 3 and Xbox 360. There have been no updates on the development of the titles for the consoles and the console versions were cancelled.

The first closed beta test was scheduled for April 27, 2011, while the open beta test and commercial release were to be determined within the year.

In July 2011, Tencent gained the publishing rights of Blade & Soul in China, and made its first appearance at ChinaJoy. Blade & Soul launched in China on November 23, 2013, with an open beta which seamlessly moved into official launch.

The second closed beta test took place from August 29 to September 10, 2011. During this event, the Assassin class was playable for the first time.

After an open beta test on June 21, 2012, with a record number of 150,000 players, the official Korean Blade & Soul launch commenced on June 30.

In 2013, HTK gained the rights for an English version, initially intended to be released sometime in 2014 after the Chinese commercial launch of the new Blade & Soul anime in Japan alongside Taiwan and Russia.

In 2015, Blade & Soul was announced for the NA and EU region and was released in January 2016. The closed beta officially began on October 29.
NA and EU beta testing occurred over the course of five weekends beginning on October 30 and concluding on December 21.

The official launches of NA and EU servers occurred on January 19, 2016.

NCSoft developed "Blade & Soul Vision Update", the renovation project that aimed to upgrade the engine to Unreal Engine 4, and launched as the Blade & Soul Revival expansion in June 2021 for South Korea servers, and in Q3 2021 for NA and EU servers.

Media

Anime
An anime adaptation of the game was produced and aired from April to June 2014, in which Hiroshi Hamasaki and Takeuchi Hiroshi directed the anime at the studio Gonzo from scripts by Atsuhiro Tomioka. Eri Nagata adapts Hyung-Tae Kim's game character designs for animation and serves as chief animation director. The original storyline revolves around a swordswoman named Alka who travels to seek revenge for her murdered teacher. The series was streamed by Crunchyroll in the West.

Sequels
In NC Media Day 2018, NCSoft has announced three Blade & Soul IP games:
Blade & Soul S, a chibi-style open world hero-collection game
Blade & Soul M, a mobile port version of Blade & Soul 1 by Team Bloodlust
Blade & Soul 2, a direct sequel to Blade & Soul 1 by Team B2.

Due to the lack of a development team and Team Bloodlust focusing on the Unreal Engine 4 upgrade of the PC version and the console port version, the development process of Blade & Soul M has been halted and delayed. In 2020, NCSoft has announced that Team Bloodlust has canceled the mobile port version and merged the Blade & Soul M team into Team B2. As a result, Blade & Soul M was canceled, and all developed elements have been integrated into Blade & Soul 2.

Blade & Soul 2 is focusing on the all-new PVE and PVP combat experiences designed for playing on the mobile platform and on the PCs, sharing a little connection to Blade & Soul 1, and presenting the beautiful graphics that powered by Unreal Engine 4.

The sequel was launched on August 26, 2021, for the Android, iOS, and Microsoft Windows, and is planned to be released for the console in the future. Cross-play function was applied for all versions of Blade & Soul 2.

References

External links

Active massively multiplayer online games
Android (operating system) games
Fantasy massively multiplayer online role-playing games
IOS games
NCSoft games
Unreal Engine games
Fantasy video games
Video games developed in South Korea
Windows games
Sentai Filmworks
2014 anime television series debuts
Anime television series based on video games
2012 video games
Persistent worlds
Massively multiplayer online role-playing games
Video games based on Chinese mythology
Garena games